Nemaska is a Cree village municipality in the territory of Eeyou Istchee in northern Quebec; it has a distinct legal status and classification from other kinds of village municipalities in Quebec: Naskapi village municipalities, northern villages (Inuit communities), and ordinary villages.

Nemaska is the capital of the Cree Nation and the seat of the regional government, the Grand Council of the Crees and its administrative arm, the Cree Nation Government.

Demographics 

References

Cree village municipalities in Quebec
Populated places established in 1978
1978 establishments in Quebec